Little Monsters is a 2019 zombie comedy film written and directed by Abe Forsythe, starring Lupita Nyong'o, Alexander England, Josh Gad, and Kat Stewart. The story centres on a washed-up musician, a children's television personality, and a kindergarten teacher teaming up to protect a group of young schoolchildren during a sudden zombie outbreak.

The film had its world premiere at the Sundance Film Festival on January 27, 2019, and was released in the United States on October 8, 2019, by Neon, in a limited release followed by digital streaming on October 11, 2019, by Hulu. It was released in Australia on October 31, 2019, by Universal Pictures and in the United Kingdom on November 15, 2019, by Altitude. It received generally positive reviews from critics, with many praising the performances of the cast.

Plot
Dave is a dirty-talking, washed-up musician who goes through a rough break up with his girlfriend and is forced to stay with his sister, Tess, and her son, Felix, a child with a fascination for tractors, space blasters, and Darth Vader. While dropping Felix off at school, Dave meets Miss Caroline, Felix's kindergarten teacher, and is attracted to her. After a parent drops out from an upcoming field trip to a farm, Dave volunteers to chaperone, mostly to be near Miss Caroline.

On the day of the field trip, Dave is upset to learn that beloved children's television personality Teddy McGiggle is filming his show there and that Miss Caroline is engaged to someone else. Meanwhile, zombies break out of a U.S. testing facility and head straight for the farm where they attack the class, who try to escape, only to realize the farm is overrun.

The fugitives try to seek shelter in the gift shop, only to find Teddy McGiggle locked inside and refusing to let them in. Miss Caroline and the children crawl into an opening next to the shop. Dave breaks in from the roof, beats up Teddy, and unlocks the door so Miss Caroline and the children can come in. Felix then has an allergic reaction after Dave accidentally feeds him chips with dairy in them. After a botched attempt to give Felix epinephrine, Miss Caroline rushes to get some from Felix's backpack, which was left in the tractor. Teddy tries to signal a military helicopter, but falls off the roof and is rescued by Dave, to whom Teddy reveals that his real name is Nathan Schneider and that he is an alcoholic sex addict who loves MILFs and hates children.

That night, while Teddy and the children are asleep, Dave and Miss Caroline talk to each other. Dave tells her about how his father left him when he was young and that only his sister was there for him. Miss Caroline reveals that she is no longer engaged, as her fiancé had cheated on her with a coworker, and that she only wears the ring to keep single fathers away.

The next day, the military plans to bomb the gift shop the children are in and destroy the zombies to prevent an outbreak. The survivors decide to get a large vehicle and drive to safety. Teddy and Dave attempt to get Teddy's McGiggle Mobile, but Teddy betrays Dave before he is eaten by a zombie hidden in the van. Dave is forced to climb on top of the van to avoid being eaten, and makes one last call to his sister before his phone is knocked out of his hands. When all seems lost, Felix arrives driving a tractor and saves Dave, and together they rescue Miss Caroline and the children. As they drive to safety, they discover that the zombies respond to the music Miss Caroline plays. They eventually reach the military and escape just as the farm is bombed. The zombies following them are gunned down by the army.

Dave and Miss Caroline share a kiss before they and the kids are taken away and placed in quarantine for 48 hours in case of infection. The final scene shows Dave, Miss Caroline, and the kids singing Taylor Swift’s "Shake It Off," which Dave previously hated, as the kids' parents watch on with tears of joy in their eyes.

Cast

Production
In October 2017, it was announced Lupita Nyong'o and Josh Gad had joined the cast of the film, with Abe Forsythe directing from a screenplay he wrote. Keith Calder, Jess Calder, Bruna Papandrea will serve as producers on the film, under their Snoot Entertainment and Made Up Stories banners, respectively. The film was financed and produced by Screen Australia, and shot in Sydney.

Release
The film had its world premiere at the Sundance Film Festival on 27 January 2019. Shortly after, Neon and Hulu acquired distribution rights to the film. Little Monsters was released in the United States in a limited release on October 8, 2019, followed by digital streaming on Hulu on October 11, 2019. The film had a limited release in Australia on 31 October 2019 by Universal Pictures Australia, followed by a digital release on various platforms three weeks later. It was released in the United Kingdom on 15 November 2019.

Reception
The website's critical consensus reads, "Led by typically outstanding work from Lupita Nyong'o, Little Monsters is a horror/rom-com hybrid that proves the zombie genre still has fresh brains to savor." On Metacritic, the film has a score of 59 out of 100, based on 19 critics, indicating "mixed or average reviews".

References

External links

2019 comedy horror films
2010s monster movies
2019 films
American zombie comedy films
Australian comedy horror films
British zombie comedy films
Neon (distributor) films
Parodies of horror
2010s parody films
American parody films
Films produced by Keith Calder
Films about educators
Films about music and musicians
Films about television people
Films set on farms
Films shot in Sydney
Australian zombie films
Made Up Stories films
2010s English-language films
2010s American films
2010s British films
Films about children